Aleksandr Nikolayevich Gostenin (born 29 April 1955) is a Russian professional football coach and a former player. He played 2 games for FC Torpedo Moscow in the European Cup Winners' Cup 1986–87.

Honours
 Soviet Cup winner: 1986.
 Soviet Cup finalist: 1982.

External links
 Career summary at KLISF

1955 births
Living people
Soviet footballers
FC Kairat players
FC Torpedo Moscow players
Russian football managers
FC Tom Tomsk managers
FC Torpedo Moscow managers
Russian Premier League managers
Association football defenders
Neftçi PFK players